Olga Svinukhova is a retired Russian football goalkeeper, last played for Energiya Voronezh in the Russian Championship.

She was at 42 the team's most veteran player, having taken part in near to all its twelve titles between 1994 and 2003.

She has represented Russia at senior level.

References

1969 births
Living people
Russian women's footballers
Women's association football goalkeepers